This is a list of roads designated A16. Roads entries are sorted in the countries alphabetical order.

 A16 highway (Australia), a road connecting Port Adelaide and the Adelaide Hills
 A16 motorway (Belgium), a road connecting Mons and Tournai
 A16 motorway (France), a road connecting Abbeville and Dunkirk
 
 A16 motorway (Italy), a road connecting Naples and Canosa
 A16 highway (Lithuania), a road connecting Vilnius, Prienai and Marijampolė
 A16 road (Malaysia), a road connecting Kampung Labu Kubong and Kampung Changkat Petai
 A16 motorway (Netherlands), a road connecting the interchange Terbregseplein near Rotterdam and the Belgian border near Breda
 A-16 motorway (Spain), a road connecting Barcelona and El Vendrell 
 A 16 road (Sri Lanka), a road connecting Beragala and Hali ela
 A16 motorway (Switzerland), a road connecting Boncourt at the French border and Biel/Bienne
 A16 road (United Kingdom) may refer to:
 A16 road (England), a road connecting Grimsby and Peterborough
 A16 road (Isle of Man), a road connecting Bride and Point of Ayre road
 A16 road (United States of America) may refer to:
 A16 road (California), a road connecting the SR 36 and the SR 273 in Redding

See also
 List of highways numbered 16